Michael Monberg (born 17 May 1978) is a Danish politician. He is the co-founder of the Vegan Party, founded in 2018, and had been the leader of the party since its foundation. On 6 August 2020, Monberg's party had managed to collect the signatures required to run for the next Danish general election, and on 14 September this was confirmed by the Minister of Social Affairs and the Interior. On 15 September, Monberg resigned as party leader. The new leader became Lisel Vad Olsson.

References 

1978 births
Living people
People from Fredensborg Municipality
Vegan Party politicians
Leaders of political parties in Denmark